"The Steady Song" is a 2008 single by the Irish musical ensemble Republic of Loose featuring Isabel Reyes-Feeney. It features on the album Vol IV: Johnny Pyro and the Dance of Evil. When released as a single on 20 June. it spent a total of thirteen weeks in the Irish Singles Chart, climbing as far as number 12 (the band's highest placed entry in the Irish Singles Chart thus far) and receiving steady airplay throughout the summer. amongst the song's live performances have been an appearance on The View and also at Oxegen 2008.

Chart performance

References

External links
 Music video
 Lyrics and music video

2008 singles
Irish rock songs
2008 songs
Song articles with missing songwriters